Luminary is a subscription podcast network that launched on 23 April 2019.

History 
It was launched by Luminary Media LLC, a venture-backed company, that was co-founded in 2018 by Joe Purzycki, and Matt Sacks. Preceding the launch, the company had raised $100 million in venture capital, from New Enterprise Associates and Sinai Ventures, among others. Nicholas Quah, writing for Vulture.com, described Luminary's launch week as "horrific", with licensing and permission issues, and other controversies. In late 2019, Simon Sutton replaced Matt Sacks as CEO.

In May 2020, Bloomberg News called Luminary a "money-losing podcasting startup" with an app that "has struggled to find an audience since its debut in April 2019. Only about 80,000 people who tried the app have remained paying subscribers" per sources. Bloomberg reported that the company had received "$30 million in a new round" of investment and was looking for additional funding due to the COVID-19 pandemic. Nicholas Quah, for Nieman Lab, commented that in light of Bloomberg's report "it would seem that Luminary's fundamental problem is that it didn't end up signing anybody who had a powerful enough pull to drive that many paid listeners. Sure, it assembled a catalog of interesting stuff, but it doesn't have a world-building Howard Stern/Bill Simmons-level asset, plain and simple".  

Early 2022, Rishi Malhotra became CEO. In March 2022, Dave Chappelle's Pilot Boy Productions invested in Luminary with an undisclosed sum; Chappelle's podcast is also hosted by Luminary. Later that month, Jacob Kastrenakes, for The Verge, commented that "maybe Luminary's subscription-only podcast model still has legs". However, after scanning "the company's website before my chat with Malhotra, and nearly all of the shows featured on the front page hadn't posted new episodes in the past six months. In fact, if you look around Luminary's website, it's hard to find any shows that have updated recently. That's a tough sell for a service with a monthly subscription fee. [...] Luminary shows will continue to start and stop publishing throughout the year, Malhotra said, being produced in seasons more like a TV show".

Programming

References 

Podcasting companies